Jimmy Marín Vílchez (born 8 October 1997) is a Costa Rican professional footballer who plays as a midfielder for Russian Premier League club Orenburg and the Costa Rica national team. He is used as a wide midfielder or winger, on left or the right flanks.

Club career
Born in San José, Costa Rica, Marín started his senior professional career with Deportivo Saprissa in 2015. On 6 May 2015, he made his first team debut in a 3–2 victory against Carmelita. On 23 August, he scored his first goal for the club in a 1–0 victory against Pérez Zeledón. He played no further in the league, with his side going on to win it on 23 December.

On 18 May 2016, Marín moved to Herediano on a three-year contract and was immediately loaned out to Belén. On 31 October 2016, he scored his debut goal for the club in a 3–2 triumph over UCR.

Marín made his debut for Herediano on 9 January 2017, finding the net in a 2–0 victory over Pérez Zeledón.

On 2 July 2022, Marín signed with Orenburg in Russia.

International career

Youth
Marín has been capped by Costa Rica at under-20 level, representing the side at 2017 CONCACAF U-20 Championship. He was also selected by manager Marcelo Herrera in the under-20 team for the 2017 FIFA U-20 World Cup. On 7 July 2018, he was included in the under-21 team for the Central American and Caribbean Games.

Senior
On 16 June 2017, Marín was included in the provisional 26-man squad for the CONCACAF Gold Cup. However, he was omitted from the final 23-man squad. On 15 July, he was recalled to the senior team for the same competition as an injury replacement.

On 28 August 2018, Marín was called to the team as a part of a generational of new footballers for friendlies against South Korea and Japan. On 7 September, he made his debut, starting in a 2–0 defeat against Japan.

Career statistics

Club

International

International goals

Scores and results list Costa Rica's goal tally first.

Honours

Saprissa
 Liga FPD: Apertura 2015, Clausura 2021

Herediano
 Liga FPD: Clausura 2017, Apertura 2018
 CONCACAF League: 2018

Individual
 CONCACAF League Best Young Player: 2018

References

External links

1997 births
Footballers from San José, Costa Rica
Living people
Association football midfielders
Costa Rican footballers
Costa Rica under-20 international footballers
Costa Rica international footballers
Deportivo Saprissa players
Belén F.C. players
C.S. Herediano footballers
Hapoel Be'er Sheva F.C. players
F.C. Ashdod players
FC Orenburg players
Liga FPD players
Israeli Premier League players
Russian Premier League players
2017 CONCACAF Gold Cup players
2019 CONCACAF Gold Cup players
2021 CONCACAF Gold Cup players
Costa Rican expatriate footballers
Expatriate footballers in Israel
Costa Rican expatriate sportspeople in Israel
Expatriate footballers in Russia
Costa Rican expatriate sportspeople in Russia